Chondrostoma vardarense is a species of ray-finned fish in the family Cyprinidae.
It is found in Bulgaria, Greece, North Macedonia, and Turkey.
Its natural habitat is rivers.
It is threatened by habitat loss.

References

External links
 

Chondrostoma
Fish described in 1928
Taxa named by Stanko Karaman
Taxonomy articles created by Polbot